Ashland station is an MBTA Commuter Rail station in Ashland, Massachusetts. It serves the Framingham/Worcester Line. It has a long driveway leading from the south parking lot to the intersection of West Union Street (Route 135) and Voyagers Lane. Like the other stations on the line west of Framingham, Ashland serves as a park-and-ride station with 678 parking spots.

History

A station at Unionville (later Ashland, after the town separated from Hopkinton in 1846) was in use by 1838. Service to Worcester ended entirely in 1975, but resumed in 1994.

In 1994, service to Worcester was restored as mitigation for delays with reopening the Old Colony Lines. Service initially ran nonstop from Framingham to Worcester, but intermediate park and ride stops were added later as mitigation for delays in reopening the Greenbush Line. The three stations, which together cost $14.2 million, were originally scheduled to open on December 31, 2001. However, they were delayed by several factors, including a debate on whether to build full-length high-level platforms. Those were ruled out because they interfere with freight traffic; instead, smaller "mini-high" platforms plus long low platforms were built.  and  opened on June 22, 2002, followed by Ashland on August 24. Construction of the station cost $7.4 million. The new station was built to the west of the town center, where land was available for large parking lots. The downtown station still stands, and is currently used as a doctor's office.

References

External links
 
 MBTA - Ashland
 Station from Google Maps Street View

MBTA Commuter Rail stations in Middlesex County, Massachusetts
Railway stations in the United States opened in 2002
2002 establishments in Massachusetts